IC Bus (originally IC Corporation) is an American bus manufacturer.  Headquartered in Lisle, Illinois, IC is a wholly owned subsidiary of Navistar International. Established in 2002 by Navistar through the reorganization of subsidiary manufacturer American Transportation Corporation (AmTran), IC currently produces school buses and commercial-use buses for multiple applications.

The IC name stands for "Integrated Coach", referring to how the vehicles are nearly completely assembled under a single corporate structure. For all vehicles, the body and chassis are assembled within the same manufacturing facility; the latter is designed by parent company Navistar (prior to 2015, Navistar also supplied the engine). While using a chassis and hood shared with International-brand trucks, IC Bus vehicles have separate badging.

IC vehicles are produced at the Navistar Tulsa Bus Plant in Tulsa, Oklahoma; Prior to 2010, they were also assembled at the former AmTran/Ward facility in Conway, Arkansas.

History

Through its predecessor company AmTran, IC traces its roots to 1933, founded as Ward Body Works in Conway, Arkansas.  Navistar predecessor International Harvester commenced chassis production 11 years earlier, entering production in 1922.  Following the exit of several manufacturing firms from school bus production over the previous decade, IC would be the first newly established manufacturer in the 2000s.

2000s 

In 2000, the IC name came into use for the first time, as AmTran introduced an updated version of its conventional-style bus body.  While still based upon the International 3800 and sharing much of the body with its AmTran Volunteer/CS predecessor, the new bus introduced a redesigned drivers compartment and enlarged windshield.  Named the International IC (IC standing for Integrated Coach/Chassis), the new bus emphasized how the entire vehicle was produced under the corporate entity of Navistar (who had purchased AmTran outright in 1995).  To distinguish the International IC from other buses sharing the 3800 chassis, the hood of the IC was given its own grille and badging (marking the first visual update to International medium-duty trucks since 1989).

To bring the company in line with the truck manufacturing division of Navistar (at the time, International Truck and Engine), AmTran changed its name to International Truck and Bus after 2000; its model lines adopted the International brand name and badging for the body in addition to the chassis.  For 2003, International renamed its bus subsidiary a second time, to IC Corporation.  After a minor revision, the International IC adopted the IC CE-Series name (to match the FE/RE-Series transit-style buses).

During the mid-2000s, IC began an overhaul of its product line.  For 2005, the International 3300 was introduced as a cowled-chassis variant of the International 4000-series (DuraStar), becoming the first completely new cowled chassis from International since 1979.  In 2006, IC produced its first small school bus, the 30-passenger BE200.  In place of a cutaway van chassis, the BE adopted a lower-profile version of the 3300 chassis.  Externally similar to the CE, the smaller BE was designed with a flat-floor interior.

To comply with 2007 EPA emissions standards, IC buses adopted MaxxForce diesel engines for 2007, including the MaxxForce 7 6.4L V8 and the MaxxForce DT 7.6L I6.  For 2008, to improve engine ventilation, the FE was given a wider grille, with the BE and CE adopting the redesigned front bumper of the International DuraStar.

In April 2009, IC Corporation changed its name to IC Bus.

Commercial bus production 
During its existence, the commercial product offerings of AmTran had been strictly derived from its school bus bodies, consisting as a small portion of its sales.  In 2006, IC launched an expansion of its product range.  Alongside the existing commercial derivatives of the BE, CE, and RE, the company introduced buses based on a cutaway-cab version of the International DuraStar.  The HC was a range of shuttle buses; the LC was a paratransit bus with a low-floor configuration.

2010s 
For 2010, IC underwent an overhaul of its product line.  The FE-series (which entered production in 1990 as the Ward Senator, later becoming the AmTran Genesis) was discontinued, leaving the RE as its sole transit-style bus offering.  At the other end of the size spectrum, IC introduced two cutaway-cab buses derived from the International TerraStar truck.  Slotted below the HC, the AC was a commercial shuttle bus, while the AE marked the first cutaway-cab school bus produced by the company.  While using a smaller truck line for a donor chassis, the AE was offered in a higher seating capacity than the BE, up to 36 passengers.

In a branding change, from 2010 onward, Navistar badged the International 3200 (the cutaway-cab version of the DuraStar) as an IC, regardless of body manufacturer.  The IC "wing" logo was revised slightly in 2013 for 2014 production (with Navistar script added to the emblem and to the rear bumper).

In response to the failure of its EGR emissions strategy to meet emissions standards, Navistar began to phase out MaxxForce diesel engines in favor of Cummins-produced engines.  In the CE, the Cummins ISB6.7 was introduced as an option for 2014 production, becoming the standard engine for 2015.  For the RE, the MaxxForce DT was replaced by a Cummins L9 diesel, with a Cummins B6.7 introduced during 2018 for the CE.

In the mid-2010s, IC centralized production around school buses.  After 2014, the AE/AC, BE, and LC were discontinued.  For 2018, the HC was replaced by the TC (as the MV replaced the DuraStar); within the shuttle bus segment, IC reverted to a role of chassis provider, no longer producing completely-bodied vehicles.

Alongside the TC medium-duty cutaway cab, IC Bus currently produces the CE and RE-series as school buses/MFSABs (activity buses); both model lines are also offered in commercial applications (derived from the school bus bodies).

Alternative-fuel strategy 
In the United States, Navistar was the sole diesel engine manufacturer to pursue the use of exhaust gas recirculation (EGR) to control diesel emissions rather than selective catalytic reduction (SCR).  The company claimed EGR posed an advantage in overall fluid economy (measuring combined diesel + urea consumption), although separate testing resulted in an advantage with SCR.

In 2015, IC debuted its first alternative-fuel vehicle, showing a propane-powered CE-Series with a PSI 8.8L V8 engine.  In 2016, the same engine was introduced in a gasoline-fueled configuration.

Electric bus 
It is the second electric vehicle to be delivered from the Navistar-Volkswagen alliance. The chargE started production in 2019

2020s 
For 2022, IC Bus would undergo another overhaul of its product line. It was announced that the RE Series will be discontinued in 2024, leaving IC Bus solely as a Type C only manufacturer.

Products

School/commercial buses
Model designations
Prior to 2010, IC used the following nomenclature (on school buses) to designate the engine type; subsequently, only the model prefix has been used.

Prototype vehicles

Forward Advantage Prototype
The IC FE Forward Advantage was a school bus prototype built by IC in 2008 as a testbed of a "flat-floor" design in the stepwell due to the compact design of the Caterpillar C7 engine.  It also included some front-end styling modifications influenced by the severe-service line of International trucks.  As Caterpillar has withdrawn from producing diesel engines for the school bus market, the Forward Advantage will not see production in its current form since its design was tailored to the Caterpillar engine.

Hybrid diesel-electric buses 
IC offers hybrid diesel-electric powertrains in the CE conventional school bus as an option.  The buses provide a claimed approximately 40% to 65% better fuel economy but cost about two and a half times more than a standard diesel bus ($210,000 versus $80,000).

Enova Systems entered into a long-term supply agreement with IC Bus that guarantees that Enova's proprietary Post Transmission Parallel Hybrid Electric drive system will be used in IC Bus' hybrid electric school buses. The hybrid school bus project features Enova's charge depleting (or "plug-in") or charge-sustaining systems. The drivetrain is powered by Valence Technology lithium ion phosphate battery modules.  The braking system utilizes regenerative braking both as a means to reduce wear on the service brakes and to supply the batteries with extra power.

Motorcoach prototypes
At the 2008 American Public Transportation Association Expo trade show, Navistar announced its intention to enter the intercity motorcoach segment by 2010, unveiling two prototypes produced by IC Bus.  Using the MaxxForce 13 powerplant, IC Bus produced a 40-foot-long prototype alongside a 45-foot prototype.  Using wind-tunnel design, the company predicted similar fuel efficiency gains that were seen with the streamlined International ProStar semitractor.

Following the two prototypes, IC Bus abandoned its efforts in the motorcoach segment, concentrating its commercial buses on school bus derivatives and the HC-Series (a cutaway variant of the International DuraStar).

Low Floor IC CE Shorty 
In 2008, Navistar announced that they would be developing an ICCE Low Floor Shorty School Bus. This involved producing a low floor chassis designed specifically for the CE Shorty. The bus remained the same on the outside in terms of design. It was unknown when production of this bus would start, however due to unknown circumstances, IC Bus abandoned release of the Low Floor IC CE Shorty. The idea of a low floor school bus however, was never completely abandoned, as Collins would introduce their own Low Floor Type A school bus in 2017 built using a RAM low floor chassis.

Assembly
All IC Corporation/IC Bus vehicles are produced in the Tulsa, Oklahoma, facility opened by AmTran in 1999.  Prior to 2008, Type D models were produced in the Ward/AmTran facility in Conway, Arkansas.

IC Corporation announced potential layoffs of up to 500 workers at the Conway plant (which employed approximately 1,000) in June 2007. Demand for school buses were affected by a price hike in the 2007 model year due to more stringent emissions regulations. School districts increased their purchases of the 2006 model year buses, which were $5,000 to $7,000 less than the 2007 model year buses, and the Conway plant was producing approximately 30 buses per day, down from 50 buses per day during the peak demand. Although the company later announced no layoffs would occur in 2007, the layoffs materialized on January 11, 2008, when IC Corporation announced a layoff of about 300 employees at the Conway, Arkansas Bus Plant. This was just under the maximum proportion of employees that could be laid off in Conway without the company violating the WARN Act, which requires employers to give 60 days notice of a mass layoff or plant closing. In addition to the layoffs, the company also announced a 50 percent reduction in bus production at the Conway plant. IC Corp. officials cited a lack of new orders as the reason for the layoffs. However, the company had recently announced increased production at the plant in Tulsa, Oklahoma. This stoked fears in Conway that the company was planning to shut down the plant in the near future and move all production to the newer, and non-union, Tulsa plant.

170 more workers were laid off at the Conway plant in March 2009. At the time, production had slowed to 16 buses per day, and following the layoffs, "cancellation of a huge order" resulted in production dropping to 8 buses per day. On November 5, 2009, IC Bus announced that its Conway plant would no longer assemble buses after January 18, 2010, projecting elimination of 477 jobs. The Conway facilities would serve as fabrication shops and manufacture parts, but would no longer produce complete buses. The company cited low demand by school districts and contractors during the recessionary economic climate in the United States. "We have to consolidate our bus-assembly operations into one facility," Navistar spokesman Roy Wiley said. "Unfortunately for Conway, Tulsa is a much newer facility." Navistar sold off the Conway property in 2014.

On June 5, 2012, the Tulsa, Oklahoma IC Bus assembly plant produced its 100,000th vehicle. Workers at the Tulsa plant joined the United Auto Workers in 2013. The Conway property was acquired by DBG Canada Ltd., a manufacturer of parts for the heavy truck industry, in 2017, and DBG announced it would make Conway its United States headquarters.

See also

 AmTran - corporate predecessor
 Navistar International - parent company

References

External links
ICBus.com - official company web site

 

Navistar International
School bus manufacturers
Manufacturing companies based in Illinois
Vehicle manufacturing companies established in 2002
Companies based in Arkansas
Conway, Arkansas
Warrenville, Illinois
Hybrid electric bus manufacturers
Companies based in DuPage County, Illinois
American companies established in 2002
Bus manufacturers of the United States
Electric vehicle manufacturers of the United States